Beautiful Life is the final studio album released by Washington, D.C.-based go-go musician Chuck Brown. The album was released posthumously on August 19, 2014.

Track listing

References

External links
 

2014 albums
Chuck Brown albums
Albums published posthumously
Neo soul albums